The Great Seer (also known as The Great Geomancer) is a 2012 South Korean historical television series, starring Ji Sung, Ji Jin-hee, Song Chang-eui, Kim So-yeon and Lee Yoon-ji. Set during the turbulent decline of Goryeo, it is about practicers of divination and the power that they hold over the fate of the country. It aired on SBS from October 10, 2012 to February 7, 2013 on Wednesdays and Thursdays at 21:55 for 35 episodes.

Plot
The Great Seer begins during the reign of King Gongmin (Ryu Tae-joon). But despite being about seers, geomancers, divinators and the like, this drama is less about the fantasy and more about the political movers and shakers — people who had the power to advise, and therefore control, kings. Yi Seong-gye (Ji Jin-hee) is the general who led the overthrow of Goryeo and established the Joseon Dynasty, becoming its first king.

Mok Ji-sang (Ji Sung) is a gifted seer/geomancer, born with the ability to see into people's pasts and futures. There are those who believe falsely that he has dark supernatural powers, thinking him possessed by ghosts. When he comes of age in the late Goryeo era, he becomes a scholar of divination, and a reader of geography, faces, and the like to tell fortunes — an area with much influence at the time. He eventually becomes a "king-maker," who holds the key to a major political shift in the overthrow of Goryeo and the rise of Joseon when he backs General Yi and effectively shapes the future of Korea as we know it.

Lee Jung-geun (Song Chang-eui) is General Yi's other advisor and Ji-sang's rival. Hae-in (Kim So-yeon) is a healer whose destiny is tied to General Yi, but she falls in love with the seer. Ban-ya (Lee Yoon-ji) is a woman who was sold off as a gisaeng at a young age, but becomes a concubine to King Gongmin's advisor, and bears a son. King Gongmin takes in that son as his, and the boy becomes Woo of Goryeo (Lee Tae-ri) — the king that General Yi dethrones in a coup d'état.

Cast

Ji Sung as Mok Ji-sang 
Lee David as young Ji-sang
Choi Ro-woon as child Ji-sang
Ji Jin-hee as Yi Seong-gye
Kim So-yeon as Hae-in
Son Na-eun as young Hae-in 
Song Chang-eui as Lee Jung-geun
Noh Young-hak as young Jung-geun
Lee Yoon-ji as Ban-ya
Park Min-ji as young Ban-ya
Jo Min-ki as Lee In-im
Oh Hyun-kyung as Soo Ryun-gae
Lee Seung-yeon as Young-ji
Lee Jin as young Young-ji 
Lee Young-beom as Hyo-myung
Choi Jae-woong as Dong-ryoon
Ahn Gil-kang as Monk Muhak
Kim Gu-taek as Lee Ji-ran
Do Ki-seok as Woo Ya-sook
Baek Seung-hyeon as Jeong Do-jeon
Kang Kyung-heon as Bong-choon
Yoon Joo-hee as Lady Kang, Seong-gye's wife
Oh Hee-joon as Yi Bang-gwa
Choi Tae-joon as Yi Bang-won
Kim Tae-hee  as Dan-wi
Jung Dong-kyu as Han Choong
Seol Yoo-jin as Han Choong's servant
Park Min-jung as In-yeong, owner of gisaeng house 
Ryu Tae-joon as King Gongmin
Bae Min-hee as Queen Noguk
Kim Chung as Queen Dowager Myeongdeok
Lee Tae-ri as King Woo
Jung Joon-won as young Woo
Kim Byung-choon as King Gongyang
Lee Moon-sik as Hong Jong-dae
Jo Han-chul as Moo-young
Lee Won-jae as Noh Young-soo
Cha Hyun-woo as Won-hae
Son Byong-ho as Choe Yeong
Yoo Ha-joon as Shin Don
Lee Yoo-sung as Hong Ryun
Park Joon-hyuk as Jeong Mong-ju
Lee Do-yeop as Yi Kang-dal
Kim Min-hyuk as Won-gae
Kim Da-hyun as Sung-bok
Joo Min-soo as young Sung-bok
Moon Hee-kyung as Daemuryeo
Jung Soo-in as gisaeng
Hong Yi-joo as Wol-hyang
Lee Yong-jin as Yi Ga-noh
Jo Hwa-young as Yoo Sun
Chun Bo-geun as patron saint
Kim Ik-tae as viceroy for the Ming Dynasty
Kim Beom-seok as royal escort warrior
Lee Seok-joon as Jo Min-soo
Ban Min-jung as Lady Park
Kim Sung-hoon as executioner
Jin Seon-kyu as Lee Han-baek
Jeon Jin-seo

Original soundtrack
 "Breaking Fate" - Park Gyu-ri of Kara
 "Flower" (kids version) - Shin Ye-rim
 "Flower" (adult version) - Yo Ar
 "Tears Flow" - Min Kyu
 "Just Once" - Kyuhyun of Super Junior
 "The Path to the Sky" - Chi Yeol
 "With You Being the Only Reason" - Ock Joo-hyun

Promotions
To promote the series cast members Ji Jin-hee, Ji Sung and Song Chang-eui guest starred on the SBS Good Sunday variety show Running Man on episodes 116 and 117, which aired on October 21 and 28, 2012, along with Suzy of miss A and Yubin of Wonder Girls.

Ratings

International broadcast
It aired in Thailand on 3SD from June 13 to August 30, 2015, with reruns on Channel 3 beginning January 21, 2016.

Notes

References

External links
  
 

2012 South Korean television series debuts
2013 South Korean television series endings
Seoul Broadcasting System television dramas
Korean-language television shows
Television series set in the Joseon dynasty
Television series set in Goryeo
South Korean historical television series
Television series set in the 14th century